Cardinal Allen Catholic High School is a mixed 11–16 voluntary-aided Roman Catholic faith school in Fleetwood, Lancashire, England.

Curriculum 
Art, Craft and Design, Business and Communication Systems, Catering and Hospitality, Computer Science, Construction, Creative Technology, Digital Applications, Drama, English, Food and Nutrition, French, Geography, History, Information and Communication Technology, Maths, Music, Physical Education, Product Design, Personal Social Health Citizenship Economic Education, Religious Studies, Science, Spanish

Attainment 
KS4 Performance table  indicating year on year comparisons for percentage achieving 5+ A*-C GCSEs (or equivalent) including English and maths GCSEs.

Awards 
 Design Mark
 International School Award 2012 - 2015
 Specialist Schools and Academies Trust - High Performance at GCSE
 Lancashire Green Awards
 ICT Mark Accredited
 Geography Award 2013
 Eco Schools Ambassador Status

Notable former pupils 
 Alfie Boe, singer
 Scott Davies, footballer
 Tom Barkhuizen, footballer

References

External links 
 EduBase

Secondary schools in Lancashire
Catholic secondary schools in the Diocese of Lancaster
Voluntary aided schools in England
Schools in the Borough of Wyre
Educational institutions established in 1963
1963 establishments in England